The 2023 FIA World Rallycross Championship will be the tenth season of the FIA World Rallycross Championship, an auto racing championship recognized by the Fédération Internationale de l'Automobile (FIA) as the highest class of international rallycross.

Johan Kristoffersson is the reigning drivers champion. Kristoffersson Motorsport are the reigning teams champions.

Calendar 

On 7 December 2022, the provisional 2023 calendar was announced during the FIA World Motorsport Council decisions. A calendar update was issued on 3 March 2023.

Series News 

 After having trialed a new weekend format in 2022, the format was adjusted again for the 2023 season. The weekend structure was reverted to a system of four heats of five cars (reduced to three heats at double-header events), with two semis and a final with six cars each using a staggered grid. Free practice replaced the shakedown as the first session of the weekend. SuperPole was retained from the 2022 season. Heat 2 will have the fastest drivers from heat 1 going first, whereas heat 3 and 4 will have the slowest drivers from the previous heat going first. At the end of the heats, the top 3 drivers in the heat ranking will be given championship points; 3 to the winner of the heat rankings, 2 to second, and 1 to third. After the final, championship points are awarded to the top 15 drivers across the whole weekend.

Notes

References

External links 

 

World Rallycross Championship seasons
World Rallycross
World Rallycross